For other people named Jean Jones, see Jean Jones (disambiguation)

Jean Jones (born 1932), is a former international lawn bowler from Jersey.

Bowls career
In 1995 she won the triples bronze gold medal at the Atlantic Bowls Championships with Denise Falkner and Val Stead.

The following year she won a silver medal in the pairs at the 1996 World Outdoor Bowls Championship in Leamington Spa with Sheila Syvret.

She also competed in the Commonwealth games during 1998.

References

Jersey female bowls players
1932 births
Bowls players at the 1998 Commonwealth Games
Living people
Commonwealth Games competitors for Jersey